Archaeornithomimus (meaning "ancient bird mimic") is a genus of ornithomimosaurian theropod dinosaur that lived in Asia during the Late Cretaceous period, around 96 million years ago in the Iren Dabasu Formation.

Discovery and naming

In 1923, during the American Museum of Natural History expedition by Roy Chapman Andrews to Inner Mongolia, Peter Kaisen discovered numerous theropod remains in three quarries. They consist of the largely disarticulated remains of several individuals and material of the skull and the lower jaws is lacking. These were named and shortly described by Charles Whitney Gilmore in 1933 as a new species of Ornithomimus: Ornithomimus asiaticus. The specific name refers to the Asian provenance. The species was placed in the new genus Archaeornithomimus by Dale Russell in 1972, making Archaeornithomimus asiaticus the type species of the genus. The generic name combines that of Ornithomimus with a Greek ἀρχαῖος (archaios), "ancient", because Russell believed that the layers in which Archaeornithomimus was found dated to the Cenomanian-Turonian ages, about 95 million years ago, making it one of the oldest ornithomimids known at the time. Gilmore had not assigned a holotype specimen; in 1990 David Smith and Peter Galton in the first comprehensive description of the fossils, choose specimen AMNH 6565, a foot, as the lectotype. The fossils were found in the Iren Dabasu Formation, which has been dated to the Cenomanian age, around 95.8 ± 6.2 million years ago.

Foot bones found in the Early Cretaceous Arundel Formation of Maryland were referred by Othniel Charles Marsh to Allosaurus medius in 1888. In 1911 Richard Swann Lull named these as a new species of Dryptosaurus: Dryptosaurus grandis. In 1920 Gilmore renamed them to a new species of Ornithomimus. However, because Ornithomimus grandis already existed, he renamed the species Ornithomimus affinis. In 1972 Dale Russell renamed them as a second species of Archaeornithomimus: Archaeornithomimus affinis. However, in 1990 Smith and Galton concluded that the remains were not ornithomimosaurian and came from some other small theropod.

In 1995 a supposed third species of Archaeornithomimus was named by Lev A. Nesov: Archaeornithomimus bissektensis, based on the holotype N 479/12457, a femur and metatarsals of a juvenile, found in the Bissekty Formation of Uzbekistan, dating to the Turonian-Coniacian. Nevertheless, the affinity of A. bissektensis is generally doubted or not mentioned.

Description

Solid evidence coming from other ornithomimosaurian relatives suggest that Archaeornithomimus was a feathered animal, with very ratite-like feathers and equipped with a keratinous beak.

The hindlimbs were robustly built. The third metatarsal was not pinched at the upper end, so the foot was not arctometatarsalian. The cervical vertebrae are highly pneumatized with very complex internal chambers across the neural arches and the centrum (body of the vertebra), indicating the presence of cervical air sacs. The anterior dorsal and some caudal vertebrae features some degree of pneumacity, however, the sacral vertebrae are apneumatic.
In a 2001 study conducted by Bruce Rothschild and other paleontologists, 229 foot bones referred to Archaeornithomimus were examined for signs of stress fracture, but none were found.

Classification

Russell assigned Archaeornithomimus to the Ornithomimidae. Recent cladistic analyses either confirm this or recover the species outside of the Ornithomimidae, basal in the Ornithomimosauria. During the description of Hesperornithoides, an extensive Coelurosauria phylogenetic analysis (also known as the Lori matrix) was conducted in order to determine the position of this paravian. Here, Archaeornithomimus was recovered within the Garudimimidae being a relative of Arkansaurus:

Paleoecology

The remains of Archaeornithomimus were found in the Iren Dabasu Formation, which dates back to the Cenomanian stage about 96 million years ago during the Late Cretaceous period. The environments present on the formation were mainly large floodplain terrains with braided rivers and meanders that were connected to the ocean, supporting extensive vegetation as seen on the palaeosol development and the numerous remains from herbivorous dinosaurs such as hadrosauroids.

Like other members of the Ornithomimosauria, Archaeornithomimus was likely an omnivore equipped with a horny beak, eating everything from small mammals, to plants and fruit, to eggs, and even hatchlings of other Asian dinosaurs.

Other dinosaurs that co-existed with Archaeornithomimus in the formation included other theropods, such as Alectrosaurus, Erliansaurus, Gigantoraptor and Neimongosaurus. Herbivorous dinosaurs were represented by Bactrosaurus, Gilmoreosaurus and Sonidosaurus.

See also
 Timeline of ornithomimosaur research
 Glossary of dinosaur anatomy

References

Ornithomimids
Late Cretaceous dinosaurs of Asia
Fossils of Uzbekistan
Bissekty Formation
Fossil taxa described in 1972
Taxa named by Dale Russell